Pratim Chatterjee (1940–2018) was an Indian politician from the state of West Bengal and a former minister in the West Bengal Government.

References 

West Bengal politicians
1940 births
2018 deaths